The Naccache–Stern Knapsack cryptosystem is an atypical public-key cryptosystem developed by David Naccache and Jacques Stern in 1997. This cryptosystem is deterministic, and hence is not semantically secure. While unbroken to date, this system also lacks provable security.

System Overview
This system is based on a type of knapsack problem. Specifically, the underlying problem is this: given integers c,n,p and v0,...,vn, find a vector  such that

The idea here is that when the vi are relatively prime and much smaller than the modulus p this problem can be solved easily. It is this observation which allows decryption.

Key Generation
To generate a public/private key pair

Pick a large prime modulus p.
Pick a positive integer n and for i from 0 to n, set pi to be the ith prime, starting with p0 = 2 and such that .
Pick a secret integer s < p-1, such that gcd(p-1,s) = 1.
Set .

The public key is then p,n and v0,...,vn.  The private key is s.

Encryption
To encrypt an n-bit long message m, calculate

where mi is the ith bit of the message m.

Decryption
To decrypt a message c, calculate

This works because the fraction

is 0 or 1 depending on whether pi divides cs mod p.

See also
Merkle–Hellman knapsack cryptosystem
Graham–Shamir knapsack cryptosystem

References
Original Paper
Recent bandwidth improvement

Public-key encryption schemes